Charles Warren Bonython, AO (11 September 1916 – 2 April 2012) was an Australian conservationist, explorer, author, and chemical engineer.  A keen bushwalker, he is perhaps best known for his role, spanning many years, of working towards the promotion, planning and eventual creation of the Heysen Trail. His work in conservation has been across a range of issues, but especially those connected with South Australian arid landscapes.

Early years
Bonython was born in Adelaide, South Australia, to John Lavington Bonython (later Sir John), and Constance Jean, née Warren (Lady Jean Bonython). His grandfather was Sir John Langdon Bonython. He had one brother (Kym Bonython), one sister (Katherine Downer Verco), a half-brother (John Langdon Bonython) and two half-sisters (Lady Elizabeth (Betty) Hornabrook Wilson and Ada Bray Heath). (See John Lavington Bonython#Family for more detail.)

Industrial career
Bonython studied chemical engineering at Adelaide University. Upon graduating with a Bachelor of Science, he accepted a position with ICI Australia Ltd. There he conducted research and management in the solar salt industry, from 1940 to 1966, and served for 20 years as manager of the salt fields at Dry Creek in Adelaide. At the age of 50 he retired from his industrial career in 1966 in order to devote his time to his many other interests.

Conservation and exploration
Bonython's lifetime interests in conservation and exploration were first publicly recognised by his appointment as President, Royal Geographical Society of Australasia, South Australian Branch, in 1959.

Notable achievements
Bonython is credited with the conception of the Heysen Trail.

In 1973, he and friend Charles McCubbin walked 463 kilometres north-south across the Simpson Desert, pulling a 250-kilogram loaded trailer dubbed "the Comalco Camel", the trek lasting 32 days.

In 1982, he and companion walker Terry Kreig became the first white people to walk the 500 km around the shores of Lake Eyre.

At the age of 75, he climbed Mount Kilimanjaro.

Committees and awards
Source:
 President, Royal Geographical Society of Australasia South Australian Branch 1959-61
 South Australian Chairman, Water Research Foundation of Australia 1961-76
 Foundation Committee Member, Australian Solar Energy Society 1962
 Colombo Plan Adviser on salt to the Ceylon government 1964
 Member of the first executive of the Australian Conservation Foundation 1965-73.
 Director, Dampier Salt Ltd 1968-79.
 President, Conservation Council of South Australia 1971-75
 President, National Trust of South Australia 1971-76
 Chairman, Long Distance Trail Committee 1971-78
 Member of the Australian Heritage Commission 1976-91
 Chairman, Evaluation Panel for Natural Areas in South Australia, Australian Heritage Commission 1977-91
 Member of the Uranium Advisory Council 1978-83
 Officer of the Order of Australia 1980, in recognition of service to conservation
 President, Royal Society of South Australia 1980-81
 Chairman, Reserves Advisory Committee to Minister of Environment and Planning South Australia 1981-84
 John Lewis Gold Medal (for Exploration), Royal Geographical Society of Australasia (SA Branch) 1984
 President, Scientific Expedition Group 1984-?
 President, Council of the National Parks Foundation of South Australia 1985-89
 Australian Geographic Adventurer of the Year 1990

Personal
In his early years, Warren Bonython owned the first MG sports car in South Australia, and set the speed record on Sellicks Beach.

He married Cynthia Eyres Young, daughter of Mr. and Mrs. Frank Young of Romalo Avenue Magill, on 12 April 1941 at the Church of the Epiphany at Crafers.
 
He began bushwalking while living in Melbourne in the 1940s. With his wife Cynthia, (known as Bunty), together they walked through the Dandenong and Cathedral Ranges. With the birth of the first of their three children, (Simon, Veryan and Alice), Bunty decided against further bushwalking, but supported him in his subsequent walks. After World War II, he returned with his family to Adelaide, and from this base continued to plan long walks, in outback South Australia and elsewhere. His walks included: walking the length of the MacDonnell Ranges; the Larapinta Trail; Lake Eyre; Northern India to the border of Kashmir; the Sierra Club’s high trek in Nevada; climbing the mountains of Maui and walking through the craters; numerous visits to New Zealand; the Everest Trek; and the 463 km crossing of the Simpson Desert, described in his book "Walking the Simpson Desert".

Except for the period in Melbourne, the Bonythons lived their entire married life in "Romalo House", (located at 24 Romalo Avenue, Magill, South Australia), having bought the home and adjacent land from Bunty's parents. In 2000 it was announced: "The undeveloped allotment at 22 Romalo Avenue Magill, formerly owned by Warren and Bunty Bonython, is being amalgamated with the adjoining walkway to form a reserve to be known as Young Park. This has been made possible through the generosity of the Bonythons and assistance from the State Government Open Space Planning and Development Fund."<ref>Mayor's report, Minutes of Council Meeting, 11 December 2001, City of Burnside, pg.2The official opening of Young Park in Magill took place on 27 November. The creation of this small urban nature reserve was made possible through the generosity of Warren and Bunty Bonython, and matching funds from Council and the State Government Open Space Planning and Development Fund. The park is named after Frank and Phillis Young, the former owners of the nearby Romalo House and parents of Bunty Bonython.</ref>

From an early age, Bunty Bonython has had a deep interest and love of history. Her written works include a brief history of Beaumont House, and two books about St George's Church Magill, where she has been the honorary historian for many years.

A funeral service for Warren was conducted on 12 April 2012 in St Peters Cathedral.

Publications
Incomplete list:
 1953 - The filling and drying of Lake Eyre (with Bruce Mason), Reprinted from the Geographical Journal, Vol. CXIX, Part 3, September 1953.
 1956 - The salt of Lake Eyre, its occurrence in Madigan Gulf and its possible origin. Reprinted from Transactions of the Royal Society of South Australia, v. 79, May 1956. Second edition,  Libraries Board of South Australia, 1965.
 1958 - The influence of salinity upon the rate of natural evaporation, Climatology and micro climatology : proceedings of the Canberra symposium (held October 1956).
 1966 - Factors determining the rate of solar evaporation in the production of salt. Symposium on Salt (2nd : 1965 : Cleveland)
 1971 – Walking the Flinders Ranges. Rigby: Adelaide. (Reprinted in 2000 by the Royal Geographical Society of South Australia). 
 1975 – Conservation in Australia. (Illustrated by Douglas Luck). Rigby: Adelaide. 
 1976–1981 – I'm no lady: the reminiscences of Constance Jean, Lady Bonython, O.B.E. 1891-1977. (Edited by C. Warren Bonython and issued in progressive chapter-instalments).
 1980 – Walking the Simpson Desert. Rigby: Adelaide. 
 1987 - History of the Heysen Trail, www.heysentrail.asn.au
 1989 – The Great Filling of Lake Eyre in 1974. (With A. Stewart Fraser). Royal Geographical Society of Australasia: Adelaide. 
 1998 - Unravelling the secrets of Arkaroo and Curdimurka : the Gammon Ranges and Lake Eyre over the last 50 years. Reprint from the Journal of the Historical Society of South Australia, Number 26, 1998.

Commemorations
 Bonython is remembered in the naming of the Warren Bonython Link, which joins the eastern and western sections of the Mount Remarkable National Park.

See also
Vulkathunha-Gammon Ranges National Park
Bonython

References and notes

External links
Photos
Photo of C Warren Bonython AO, 1987
Warren and Cynthia Bonython, nd
Warren Bonython and Terry Kreig, 1982. Conservationist walker Warren Bonython with former geology teacher Terry Kreig (member of Eyre Consulative Committee to the Environment Department) during trek around Lake Eyre in 1982.''
Obituaries
Vale Warren Bonython, Simon Blight, Council Member, Friends of the Heysen Trail, 3 April 2012
Tribute to Warren Bonython, Allan Holmes, Chief Executive of the Department of Environment and Natural Resources, 3 April 2012
Vale C. Warren Bonython 1916-2012, Warren Field, Australian Geographic, 3 April 2012 
Vale Warren Bonython - Heysen Trail pioneer, Sylvia O'Regan, Australian Geographic, 4 April 2012

1916 births
2012 deaths
Australian chemical engineers
Officers of the Order of Australia
University of Adelaide alumni
Imperial Chemical Industries people
Australian conservationists
Warren